Premiered by Ellington  is an album by American pianist, composer, and bandleader Duke Ellington, recorded in 1953. The album was originally released as a 10" album and was Ellingon's first release on the Capitol label. The album has not been released on CD, but the tracks have appeared on The Complete Capitol Recordings of Duke Ellington, released by Mosaic Records in 1995.

Reception
The Allmusic review awarded the album 3 stars.

Track listing
 "My Old Flame" (Sam Coslow, Arthur Johnston) - 3:13    
 "Three Little Words" (Bert Kalmar, Harry Ruby) - 3:45  
 "Stormy Weather" (Harold Arlen, Ted Koehler) - 3:12  
 "Cocktails for Two (Coslow, Johnston) - 2:58
 "Flamingo" (Ed Anderson, Ted Grouya) - 3:42  
 "Stardust" (Hoagy Carmichael, Mitchell Parish) - 2:29 
 "I Can't Give You Anything But Love" (Dorothy Fields, Jimmy McHugh) - 3:11  
 "Liza" (George Gershwin, Gus Kahn, Ira Gershwin) - 3:14
Recorded Capitol Studios, Los Angeles on April 6 (track 4), April 7 (tracks 1-3, 6 & 7) and April 9 (tracks 5 & 8), 1953

Personnel
Duke Ellington – piano
Cat Anderson, Willie Cook, Ray Nance, Clark Terry - trumpet
Quentin Jackson, Juan Tizol, Britt Woodman - trombone
Jimmy Hamilton - clarinet, tenor saxophone
Rick Henderson - alto saxophone
Russell Procope - alto saxophone, clarinet
Paul Gonsalves - tenor saxophone
Harry Carney - baritone saxophone, bass clarinet
Wendell Marshall - bass 
Butch Ballard - drums

References

Capitol Records albums
Duke Ellington albums
1953 albums